The 33rd Army Corps was an Army corps in the Imperial Russian Army.

Part of
9th Army: 1915 - 1916
7th Army: 1916 - 1917
8th Army: 1917

Corps of the Russian Empire